is an original net animation by Shigeto Yamagara. The plot revolves around the friendship between an aspiring manga artist and a stray cat he takes in. It was adapted into a live-action film in 2011.

Cast
Aoi Nakamura (manga artist)
Maaya Sakamoto (voice of cat)

References

2001 anime OVAs
2001 anime ONAs
2010s Japanese-language films
2010s Japanese films